North Cape Tunnel is one of the longest and the northernmost of the subsea road tunnels in Norway. It is located in Nordkapp Municipality in Troms og Finnmark county in the far northern part of Norway. The tunnel takes the European route E69 highway under the Magerøysundet strait between the Norwegian mainland and the large island of Magerøya. The tunnel was built between 1993 and 1999, along with the Honningsvåg Tunnel. The tunnels were built to connect the mainland of Norway with the town of Honningsvåg and the tourist attraction at the North Cape. The tunnel was officially opened on 15 June 1999 by King Harald V of Norway. Before the tunnel was built, a ferry carried the traffic across the sea between the village of Kåfjord and the town of Honningsvåg.

The tunnel takes its name from the North Cape on the northern shore of Magerøya island. North Cape Tunnel is part of the European route E69 highway. Since 29 June 2012, there is no longer a toll for passing through the tunnel.

The tunnel has automatic anti-freezing doors which close the mouths of the tunnel in the winter to avoid the freezing of any leaking water. These gates open automatically when cars approach and are permanently open in the summer, when traffic is denser.

References

Road tunnels in Troms og Finnmark
Former toll tunnels
Subsea tunnels in Norway
1999 establishments in Norway
Tunnels completed in 1999
Nordkapp
Roads within the Arctic Circle